Thomas Plunket (1785–1839) was an Irish soldier in the British Army.

Thomas Plunket or Plunkett may also refer to:

 Thomas Plunkett (1841–1885), color bearer during the American Civil War
 Thomas Plunket (Chief Justice) (died 1519), Irish landowner, lawyer and judge
 Thomas Plunket, 2nd Baron Plunket (1792–1866), bishop of Tuam, Killaly and Achonry
 Thomas Fitz-Christopher Plunket (died 1471), Irish lawyer and judge
 Tom Plunkett (1878–1957), member of the Queensland Legislative Assembly
 Thomas Plunkett, senior (1840–1913), member of the Queensland Legislative Assembly